Sir William Hutcheson Poë, 1st Baronet (20 September 1848 – 30 November 1934) was an Irish soldier and politician.

Biography
He was born the younger son of William T. Poë in Donaghadee, County Down. He joined the Royal Marines in 1867 and served in the Sudan in 1884, commanding a unit of the Camel Corps in the Relief of Khartoum in 1885. He retired in 1888.

He was a Justice of the Peace and Deputy Lieutenant for Queen's County and was appointed High Sheriff of Queen's County for 1891 and High Sheriff of Tyrone for 1893. He lived at Heywood House, Ballinakill. He was a member of the Land Conference in 1902. He was created a baronet on 2 July 1912. From 1915 to 1916 he served in Egypt during World War I, and from 1916 to 1919 was with the Red Cross in France. He was the Lord Lieutenant of Queen's County from 1920 to 1922.

He was an independent member of Seanad Éireann from 1922 to 1924. He was nominated to the Seanad by the President of the Executive Council in 1922 for 12 years. He resigned from the Seanad on 9 December 1924, on age and health grounds. Douglas Hyde was elected at a by-election to replace him.

In 1886 he married Mary Adelaide Domvile, only surviving daughter of Sir William Compton Domvile, 3rd Baronet. He was succeeded by his son Hugo, the 2nd and last Baronet.

See also

Poë-Domvile baronets

References

External links
 

1848 births
1934 deaths
People from Donaghadee
Independent members of Seanad Éireann
Members of the 1922 Seanad
Baronets in the Baronetage of the United Kingdom
British Army personnel of World War I
High Sheriffs of Queen's County
High Sheriffs of Tyrone
Lord-Lieutenants of Queen's County